Hugh Ross Norton OBE (born Marylebone, 3 April 1890 – died Bury St Edmunds, 10 January 1969) was  Archdeacon of Sudbury from 1945 to 1962.

Norton was educated at  Monkton Combe School and Wadham College, Oxford. He was ordained in 1914  and served curacies in Whitechapel, Stepney and Tottenham; also acting as a wartime Chaplain to the Forces in the Middle East. He was Precentor of  Wakefield Cathedral from 1921 to 1924; and again a Chaplain to the Forces from 1924 until 1945 when he took up his Archdeacon’s appointment. He was Rector of Horringer from 1945 to 1958; and then a Canon Residentiary of St Edmundsbury Cathedral from 1958 until 1964: there is a memorial to him in the cathedral. He was   Archdeacon Emeritus of Sudbury from 1962 until his death.

References

Officers of the Order of the British Empire
Archdeacons of Sudbury
1890 births
1969 deaths
People from Horringer
People from Marylebone
People educated at Monkton Combe School
Alumni of Wadham College, Oxford